Jeanette Ellar Panaga (born July 31, 1994) is a Filipina volleyball player. She currently plays for the Creamline Cool Smashers volleyball team in the Premier Volleyball League.

Personal life
Panaga is engaged to her fellow volleyball player, Michelle Morente.

Clubs
  Cignal HD Spikers (2016)
  Pocari Sweat Lady Warriors (2017-2018)
  Petro Gazz Angels (2019-2020)
  Creamline Cool Smashers (2021)

Awards

Individual
 2014 NCAA Season 91 "Best Attacker"
 2014 NCAA Season 91 "Best Blocker"
 2015 NCAA Season 91 "Best Blocker"
 2015 NCAA Season 91 "Finals Most Valuable Player"
 2017 Premier Volleyball Reinforced Conference "2nd Best Middle Blocker"
 2017 Premier Volleyball Open Conference "1st Best Middle Blocker"
 2018 Premier Volleyball League Reinforced Conference "1st Best Middle Blocker"
 2019 Premier Volleyball League Open Conference "2nd Best Middle Blocker"

Collegiate
 2013 NCAA Season 89 –  Bronze medal, with Benilde Lady Blazers
 2015 NCAA Season 91 –  Champions, with Benilde Lady Blazers

Club
 2017 Premier Volleyball Reinforced Conference –  Champions, with Pocari Sweat Lady Warriors
 2017 Premier Volleyball Open Conference –  Runner-up, with Pocari Sweat Lady Warriors
 2019 Premier Volleyball League Reinforced Conference –  Champions, with Petro Gazz Angels
 2019 Premier Volleyball League Open Conference -  Runner-up, with Petro Gazz Angels
 2021 Premier Volleyball League Open Conference –  Runner-up, with Creamline Cool Smashers
 2022 Premier Volleyball League Open Conference –  Champions, with Creamline Cool Smashers
 2022 Premier Volleyball League Invitational Conference –  Champions, with Creamline Cool Smashers
 2022 Premier Volleyball League Reinforced Conference -  Bronze medal, with Creamline Cool Smashers

References

1994 births
Living people
Filipino women's volleyball players
Sportspeople from Bataan
De La Salle–College of Saint Benilde alumni
21st-century Filipino women